The Packard DR-980 is an American nine-cylinder air-cooled aircraft Diesel engine first certificated in 1930. The engine was unpopular despite its economy and reliability due to the unpleasant nature of its diesel exhaust fumes and considerable vibration when running; approximately 100 were built.

Design and development
Designed by Captain Lionel Woolson and Professor Hermann Dorner, the DR-980 made the first cross-country flight with a Diesel-powered aircraft in the United States when Woolson flew from Detroit to Langley Field in 1929, a distance of 700 miles (1,126 km) with a flight time of 6 hours and 40 minutes. On a later flight in a Stinson Detroiter from Detroit to Miami, the new engine showed its economy, the cost for fuel consumption being less than one cent a mile. This aircraft (complete with its engine) is preserved at the Golden Wings Flying Museum.

In 1930, the DR-980 passed its 50-hour certification test with a continuous rating of 225 hp (168 kW) at 1,950 rpm.  Production of the DR-980 ceased following the death of Captain Woolson in an aviation accident in April 1930; his legacy was the award of the Collier Trophy in 1931 to the Packard Motor Car Company for its work with this type of engine.

One recognizable feature of later DR-980s was the oil cooler, a spiral of metal tubing placed around the propeller shaft.

Endurance record
On 28 May 1931, a Bellanca CH-300 fitted with a DR-980, piloted by Walter Edwin Lees and Frederic Brossy, set a record for staying aloft for 84 hours and 32 minutes without being refueled. This record was not broken until 55 years later by the Rutan Voyager.

Radiophone Communications Record
On 3 June 1929 the first two-way, radiophone communication took place over the skies of the Packard Proving Grounds in Utica, (now Shelby Township, Michigan).  Heretofore, gasoline powered aircraft caused too much electromagnetic interference for the weak voice signal to be heard over the static.  Only a strong Morse code signal could be heard.  As diesel engines neither have spark plugs, nor spark plug wiring the EM static was greatly reduced and allowed voice communication to be used. The two-way ground to plane voice communication was witnessed by the U.S. Department of Commerce.

Applications
Aero A.35 – prototype OK-AUA
Bellanca CH-200
Bellanca CH-300
Brunner-Winkle Bird
Buhl Airsedan
Ford Model 11
Mooney A-1
O-17 Courier
Stewart M-2
Stinson Detroiter
Verville Sport Trainer
Waco HSO and HTO

Engines on display

Museo Nacional de Aeronáutica de Argentina
National Museum of the United States Air Force.

Specifications (DR-980)

See also

References

Notes

Bibliography

 Gunston, Bill. World Encyclopedia of Aero Engines. Cambridge, England. Patrick Stephens Limited, 1989. 
Aircraft Engine Historical Society – Packard Engines
Aircraft Engine Historical Society – Development of the Diesel Aircraft Engine

External links

National Museum of the USAF – DR-980 factsheet

Air-cooled aircraft piston engines
Aircraft radial diesel engines
1920s aircraft piston engines
DR-980